Wrawby Postmill is a windmill at Wrawby near Brigg, in North Lincolnshire, England.

The mill is the last post mill in the north of England, and was built between 1760 and 1790 to serve the Elsham Hall estate. Originally it had four common sails, but through most of its working life had a more usual combination of two common and two spring sails, providing power with flexibility. It was working until the 1940s, when it had four spring sails, before becoming derelict. Following a possibility of  demolition it was acquired and restored in 1965 by Wrawby Windmill Preservation Society. Maintenance work in 2008, which returned the mill to mixed sail types, was funded by the SPAB Mill Repairs Fund and local residents.

The mill is open to the public, contains a small museum of milling tools, and holds milling demonstrations.

External links

 Wrawby Postmill - Visit Lincolnshire
National Mills Weekend: Wrawby Windmill

Industrial buildings completed in the 18th century
Museums in Lincolnshire
Windmills in Lincolnshire
Post mills in the United Kingdom
Grinding mills in the United Kingdom
Mill museums in England